André Girard may refer to:

André Girard (1901–1968), French resistance worker and artist, leader of the CARTE network
André Girard (1909–1993), French resistance worker, member of the ALLIANCE network

See also
André Gérard